Frederick William Marshall Reed (March 1894 – 1967) was an English professional footballer who made over 130 appearances as a centre half in the Football League for West Bromwich Albion. He captained the club and after his retirement as a player, served it as a trainer until 1950.

Personal life 
Reed served as a sergeant in the Royal Fusiliers during the First World War.

Career statistics

References 

English Football League players
Place of death missing
British Army personnel of World War I
English footballers
Newcastle United F.C. wartime guest players
1894 births
1967 deaths
Footballers from Newcastle upon Tyne
Association football wing halves
Royal Fusiliers soldiers
West Bromwich Albion F.C. players
West Bromwich Albion F.C. non-playing staff
Military personnel from Newcastle upon Tyne